The 1995–96 IHL season was the 51st season of the International Hockey League, a North American minor professional league. 19 teams participated in the regular season, and the Utah Grizzlies won the Turner Cup.

Regular season

Eastern Conference

Western Conference

Turner Cup playoffs 
Source:

References

External links
 Season 1995/96 on hockeydb.com

IHL
IHL
IHL
International Hockey League (1945–2001) seasons